Bunyon's Chess is an outdoor 1965 sculpture by Mark di Suvero, installed at Olympic Sculpture Park in Seattle, Washington.

Conservation work on Bunyon's Chess was completed by the Seattle Art Museum in 2018.

See also

 1965 in art

References

External links
 

1965 sculptures
Olympic Sculpture Park
Stainless steel sculptures in Washington (state)
Wooden sculptures in Washington (state)
Works by Mark di Suvero